MA Syed (1937 - 12 January 2013) was a former government official of Bangladesh who was the Chief Election Commissioner.

Early life 
MA Syed was born in 1937 in Gopalganj.

Career 
MA Syed started his career in 1960 by passing the Pakistan Civil Service (CSP) examination and joining the administration cadre. He later served as the Sub-Divisional Administrator, Deputy Commissioner and Secretary to the Government of Bangladesh. He took over as the Chief Election Commissioner of Bangladesh on 23 May 2000 and retired from the post on 22 May 2005. Under him the 8th National Parliament Election of Bangladesh was held in 2001.

References 

1937 births
2013 deaths
Chief Election Commissioners of Bangladesh
Bangladeshi civil servants
People from Gopalganj District, Bangladesh